Threecastles Castle is a three-storey tower house situated near Blessington, County Wicklow, Ireland. It is protected as a national monument.

Description
Threecastles Castle is a rectangular three-storey tower house, with a stair turret projecting from the north east corner. The walls are four to five feet thick, and are faced with cut granite. The castle was built on an east facing slope overlooking a ford on the River Liffey, where stepping stones crossing the river were also marked on an early 20th century map. With the damming of the River Liffey at Poulaphouca in 1940 and subsequent flooding of the valley, the river depth rose and is now too deep to cross. Much of the area south of the castle is now a flat marsh leading to the lakeshore.

History
The history of the castle is unclear, but it is believed that due to the castle's name there were more than one castle in the townsland. Of the other two castles, the site of one is known from a 19th-century Ordnance Survey, the third castle's site is unknown. It was probably built by Lord Deputy Gerald Fitzgerald, 8th earl of Kildare, in the 16th century. It was the site of a number of battles in the 1500s. Some sources speculate that the 'three' refers to the castle having three parts.

See also
 Castles in Great Britain and Ireland
 List of castles in Ireland

References

National Monuments in County Wicklow
Ruins in the Republic of Ireland
Tower houses in the Republic of Ireland